The Old Bridge (Macedonian: Стар мост, Star most) is a stone  arch  bridge that crosses Crna River in the proximity of the village of Bučin.

The bridge has been left to crumble, even though it was declared as a Cultural Heritage of North Macedonia.

History 

In Roman times, this bridge was built on the Crna River. Тhe bridge is considered to be a remain of a former large settlement. It is assumed that sometimes Via Egnatia passed here. Today, right next to the Old Bridge there is a newly built modern bridge.

Architecture 
The bridge is an arch bridge and it's built from stone.

Gallery

References

Bridges in North Macedonia
Kruševo Municipality
Stone arch bridges